Bijapur District, formerly known as Birjapur, is one of the 27 districts of the state of Chhattisgarh in central India. It is one of the two new districts created on May 11, 2007. As of 2011 it is the second least populous district of Chhattisgarh (out of the 18 at the time), after Narayanpur. It is the second-least literate district in India, with a literacy rate of at 41.58%, according to the 2011 census.

The present collector of Bijapur is Shri Rajendra Kumar Katara (IAS).

History
Bijapur district was formerly part of the Dantewada district. It is currently a part of the Red Corridor of Naxalite activity.

Geography
The Bijapur district occupies the south western part of Chhattisgarh. The district borders on the Narayanpur district to the north and the Dantewada district to the east. To the southwest, it borders on Telangana state, to the west on Maharashtra state. Chhattisgarh Highest Waterfall Nambi Jaldhara about 540 feet (earlier was Teerathgarh Waterfall in Dantevada about 300 feet) founded Near Usur, 64 km away from Bijapur.

This district occupies an area of 6555 km2. Bijapur is the administrative headquarters. In total, the district comprises 675 villages.

Transport
The nearest airport is at Raipur.

Railway
There is no railway station in this district as the district is situated in the western side of Bailadila Range. Railway connectivity is available to the eastern side of Bailadila Range. Nearby railway station is Dantewada, which is 92 km west of district headquarter. The track belongs to East Coast Railway zone which further connects to Jagdalpur, Jeypore and Koraput Junction .

Road
The National Highway that passes Bijapur town is the NH16. It connects Bijapur to Jagdalpur towards the east and to Nizamabad in Andhra Pradesh in the west while passing through Maharashtra.

The NH 63 at Bhopalpatnam connects Bijapur to the NH 202 leading to Warangal and Hyderabad.

Bijapur and Jagdalpur towns connects to Nizamabad in Telangana while passing through Maharashtra. A Bridge which has been made and started across the river and the ferry system which was a trouble has been solved. The indravati bridge now operates 24x7 in all weather connecting the district to States of Maharashtra and Telangana .

Also other bridge as one goes further towards Maharashtra on the NH 16, there was another bridge missing on river Pranahita near Sironcha was also inaugurated and has been helping to cross the river while connecting the road network of the area.

Demographics
According to the 2011 census, Bijapur district has a population of 255,230, roughly equal to the nation of Vanuatu. This gives it a ranking of 581st in India (out of a total of 640). Its population growth rate over the decade 2001-2011 was 8.76%. Bijapur has a sex ratio of 982 females for every 1000 males, and a literacy rate of 41.58%. Scheduled Castes and Scheduled Tribes make up 3.97% and 80.00% of the population respectively.

See also 
Dogoli

References

External links 

 Official website

 
Districts of Chhattisgarh
2007 establishments in Chhattisgarh